CN, Cn, cn and other variants may refer to:

Companies 
 Canadian National Railway, reporting mark CN
 China Netcom, a former telecommunication service provider in China, NYSE symbol
 Collegiate Network, supporting college publications
 Grand China Air IATA code CN
 Islands Nationair, an airline based in Port Moresby, Papua New Guinea, IATA code CN
 Westward Airways (Nebraska), a former airline, IATA code CN (dissolved 2005)

Media and entertainment
 Cartoon Network, an American cable channel
 List of international Cartoon Network channels

Places 
 China (People's Republic of China), ISO 3166 country code CN
 CN Centre, an arena in Prince George, British Columbia
 CN Tower, communications and observation tower in Toronto, Ontario
Station code for Cirebon railway station

Mathematics, science, and technology

Biology
 Computational neuroethology, the study of animal behavior and its control by the nervous system
 Cranial nerves, CN 0 to CN XII

Chemistry
 CN gas, a substituted acetophenone used as a riot control agent
 Copernicium, symbol Cn, a chemical element
 Cyanide, any chemical compound that contains a carbon atom triple-bonded to a nitrogen atom, -CN
 Cyano radical, molecular formula ·CN
 Cyanogen, a colorless, toxic gas with a pungent odor, (CN)2

Computing
 .cn, country code top-level domain for mainland China
 Cloud native computing, an approach in software development
 Common Name, an attribute of the Lightweight Directory Access Protocol protocol family
 Common Name, an attribute of X.509 public-key certificates
 VIA CN, a 64-bit CPU for personal computers

Mathematics
 Cn (mathematics), a classical root system
 cn (elliptic function), one of Jacobi's elliptic functions

Other uses in mathematics, science, and technology
 Carrier-to-noise ratio C/N, the signal-to-noise ratio of a modulated signal
 Curve number, a parameter used in hydrology for predicting direct runoff or infiltration from rainfall
 cN, abbreviation for centinewton, a force equal to one hundredth of a newton
 Classical nova, a type of cataclysmic variable star

Other uses 
 Cn (digraph), a digraph used in English for a few words of Greek origin
 Cnaeus (disambiguation) or Gnaeus (disambiguation), popular Roman praenomens
 Combined Nomenclature, EU customs coding
 Vehicle registration code for County Cavan, Ireland
 Vehicle registration code for Province of Cuneo, Italy
 Aircraft registration code for Morocco
 Group CN, a category of prototype racing cars
Short for "Citation needed"

See also
 CNN, an American basic cable and satellite television channel